Patricia Pike (born October 24, 1954) is an American politician. She is a member of the Missouri House of Representatives, having served since 2015. She is a member of the Republican party. Also, she owns a business and a farm.

References

1954 births
Living people
People from Adrian, Missouri
Women state legislators in Missouri
Republican Party members of the Missouri House of Representatives
21st-century American politicians
21st-century American women politicians